Newby's is a music venue, bar, pool hall, and restaurant in Memphis, Tennessee, located about a block from the University of Memphis.

History
Newby's was established in 1975 by David "Newby" Harsh. The restaurant changed over the years as it expanded with a full bar, pool room, large outside patio and then transforming an adjoining historic 1950s movie theater into a music venue.  After suffering a stroke in 1996, Harsh sold Newby's to working bartender Todd Adams in January 1997. In November 2014, Newby's closed after filing for bankruptcy that January, but reopened about a year later.

Acts
Many notable acts played the venue.  All genres of music were booked at Newby's, from Alternative Rock, Country, Hip-hop, to Electronic. The venue also hosted mixed martial arts fights. Listed are a few past shows: 

Eric Gales
Funkadelic
The Incredible Hook
The Chinese Connection Dub Embassy
Minivan Blues Band
Zack Brown
Cross Canadian Ragweed
Robert Earl Keen
John Mayer
Michael Andello
Jason Maraz
Nickel Back
Muzik Mafia
Big 'n Rich
Gretchen Wilson
They Might Be Giants
Kid Rock
Better than Ezra
Drivin N Cryin
Keller Williams
The String Cheese Incident
moe.
Del McCoury
Gillian Welch
Rehab
Al Kapone
Members of Widespread Panic
Jerry Joseph and the Jackmormons
Papa Roach
Creed
Cowboy Mouth
Ott
Dieselboy
H.I.S.T.O.R.Y.
Ratatat
Pete Yorn
Dionne Ferris
The North Mississippi Allstars
The Kudzu Kings
Davis Coen
J. D. Westmoreland
Bobby Rush
Rufus Thomas
R. L. Burnside
Junior Kimbrough
Jason D Williams
Todd Snider
Leftover Salmon

Controversies
Beginning in the 1990s, Newby's engaged in a legal dispute with Broadcast Music Inc. (BMI) over license fees levied by BMI for the right to perform music in the BMI catalog. Newby's stopped paying BMI for a yearly license due to Adams' objections to  terms of the license agreement. One focus of contention was the venue capacity, which is one determinant of the license fee. BMI based its fee on a capacity of 600, but Adams maintained that Newby's had a legal capacity of only 132 people.

Facilities
The old concert hall had a capacity of several hundred, and the bar/restaurant area offers live music with a capacity of about 200.

Typically, nationally touring bands played the concert hall and small acoustic acts played the bar side. The concert hall was closed in 2015, but the bar side was expanded and the stage improved in order to accommodate larger acts.

See also
List of concert halls

References

External links
Official website

1975 establishments in Tennessee
Buildings and structures in Memphis, Tennessee
Culture of Memphis, Tennessee
Memphis Tigers basketball
Music venues in Tennessee
Tourist attractions in Memphis, Tennessee